Multiply Group PJSC is an Abu Dhabi-based tech-focused holding company. It was listed on Abu Dhabi Securities Exchange (ADX) Main Market on December 5, 2021. Major shareholders of Multiply Group include International Holding Company (IHC) which was ranked second for the top 10 most valuable listed companies in UAE by Forbes Middle East.

The Group's investments span across 5 industries: media and communications, utilities, ventures, wellness and beauty, and the digital economy.

History

The Company started out as Multiply Marketing Consultancy LLC, established in the year 2003 with its current CEO and 3 other employees.

In 2019, the Company initiated investments and global partnerships in tech-focused companies. In 2020, International Holding Company (IHC) acquired Multiply Marketing Consultancy.

In 2021, the Company merged its operations with Viola Communications and transformed into Multiply Group, an Abu Dhabi-based tech-focused holding company.

On December 5, 2021, Multiply Group started trading on Abu Dhabi Securities Exchange (ADX) main market.

The Group carried out a series of acquisitions during 2021 including the full acquisition of Pal Cooling Holding, an increase in ownership of Viola Communication to 100 per cent and the acquisition of significant stakes in Emirates Driving Company and Omorfia Group which includes Tips & Toes, Bedashing Beauty Lounge, Jazz Lounge Spa and Creative Beauty Source, and US-based digital marketing firm Firefly.

The company's invested AED 275 million and AED 92 million respectively in visual content firm Getty Images and Rihanna’s Savage X Fenty and AED 367 million in DEWA's initial public offering. The holding company held a total of $3.2 billion (AED 11.6 billion) in assets under management (AUM) as of December 31, 2021.

Mergers and acquisitions
Starting in 2016, the company acquired 50% stake of its largest local competitor Viola Communications. In 2021, Multiply Group acquired 100% stake in PAL Cooling Holding,  51% of Omorfia Group which comprises companies such as Bedashing Beauty Lounge and Tips & Toes, 48% stake in Emirates Driving Company (EDC). Multiply Group also invested $15 million in US rideshare advertising company Firefly, $75 million in visual content firm Getty Images, and $25 million Savage X Fenty, Rihanna's direct-to-consumer e-commerce fashion business.

References

Technology companies
Companies of the United Arab Emirates
Companies based in Abu Dhabi
Investment companies of the United Arab Emirates
Multinational companies headquartered in the United Arab Emirates